Josu Sarriegi Zumarraga (born 19 January 1979) is a Spanish former footballer who played as a central defender.

In his country he played professionally with Alavés, Eibar and Athletic Bilbao, appearing in 71 La Liga games over four seasons. He added 78 matches in Segunda División (five goals in total).

From 2007 until his retirement, Sarriegi represented Panathinaikos of Greece.

Club career
Sarriegi was born in Lazkao, Gipuzkoa. After having first featured professionally for modest and amateur Basque clubs, he signed for Deportivo Alavés in 1999, making his first-team debut on 18 February 2001 in a 1–0 away win against CA Osasuna.

After a loan with neighbours SD Eibar in the second division, Sarriegi renewed his contract for a further three years, then played 28 games in the 2004–05 season as Alavés returned to La Liga after two years of absence. In the following campaign he was also first choice, but his team was relegated again.

Having missed only two league matches with another Basque side, Athletic Bilbao, in 2006–07, Sarriegi joined Greece's Panathinaikos F.C. in August 2007. On 26 November of the following year he scored the winning goal for the Athens club as it defeated Inter Milan 1–0 at the San Siro, in a UEFA Champions League group stage fixture.

On 9 July 2010, after appearing regularly over the course of three years, the 31-year-old Sarriegi extended his contract for a further two seasons. The following year, after the departures of Djibril Cissé and Gilberto Silva, he was voted by his teammates as the new captain.

References

External links

1979 births
Living people
People from Goierri
Spanish footballers
Footballers from the Basque Country (autonomous community)
Sportspeople from Gipuzkoa
Association football defenders
La Liga players
Segunda División players
Segunda División B players
SD Beasain footballers
Deportivo Alavés B players
Deportivo Alavés players
SD Eibar footballers
Athletic Bilbao footballers
Super League Greece players
Panathinaikos F.C. players
Basque Country international footballers
Spanish expatriate footballers
Expatriate footballers in Greece
Spanish expatriate sportspeople in Greece